The Visconti Castle of Castelletto is a castle of mediaeval origin located in Castelletto sopra Ticino, Piedmont, northern Italy. It is named after the Visconti house, to which it belonged between the 13th and the 20th century.

Location
At short distance from the town of Castelletto, 
the castle lies in an overlooking position near the Ticino, few hundreds meter from the point where the Lake Maggiore ceases and the southern portion of the river begins its course

History
The first mention of the castle is in the 12th century, when it was a property of the Da Castello, a family from Novara. In the 13th century it is known in the possession of members of the Visconti house: in 1236 Ottone and later Uberto Visconti di Massino, who is considered the progenitor of the Visconti di Castelletto cadet branch. In 1329, the lordship of the Visconti di Castelletto in their town was confirmed in a royal diploma. In the 15th century the dominions of the Visconti di Castelletto extended to the area surrounding the southern Lake Maggiore. The castle was remodelled over the following centuries, mainly on the western side, and transformed into an aristocratic residence. It had been a property of the Visconti di Castelletto until the beginning of the 20th century.

Today
The castle today is a private real estate. In good conditions, it still retains its original quadrilateral shape with a tower on each corner.

References

Sources

External links
 Castelletto Sopra Ticino  Portale Turismo - Castelli, palazzi, ville, badie e giardini

Castles in Piedmont